Ivan Kucherenko (born June 1, 1987) is a Ukrainian footballer playing with FC Ukraine United in the Ontario Soccer League.

Playing career

Ukraine and Central Asia 
Kucherenko began his career in 2004 with FC Kryvbas Kryvyi Rih in the Ukrainian Premier League. Throughout his tenure with Kryvbas Kryvyi Rih he spent time in the Ukrainian Second League with FC Kryvbas-2 Kryvyi Rih. In 2008, he played abroad in the Kazakhstan Premier League with FC Astana, and the following season in the Uzbekistan Super League with Lokomotiv Tashkent FK. After two seasons abroad he returned to the Ukrainian Second League to play with FC Hirnyk Kryvyi Rih, and in 2011 returned to the Uzbekistan Super League to sign with Olmaliq FK. In 2013, he returned to Kazakhstan for another stint with FC Astana-1964. 

In late 2011, he assisted FC Poltava in securing promotion to the Ukrainian First League by finishing first in the standings. Afterwards in 2013-14 he played with FC Tytan Armyansk in the Ukrainian First League, and later in the Ukrainian Football Amateur League with FC Inhulets-2 Petrove, and Druzhba Novomykolayivka.

Canada 
In 2017, he traveled abroad for the third time in order to play in the Canadian Soccer League with FC Ukraine United. In his debut season he assisted FC Ukraine in achieving a perfect season, and winning the Second Division Championship. In his sophomore year in Toronto he assisted in securing the First Division title. In 2019, he featured in the CSL Championship final against Scarborough SC, but in a losing effort. He played in the Ontario Soccer League in 2021 with Ukraine United.

Honors 
FC Ukraine United
 CSL Second Division Championship: 2017
 Canadian Soccer League First Division: 2018
 Canadian Soccer League Second Division: 2017

References 
 

1987 births
Living people
Ukrainian footballers
FC Kryvbas Kryvyi Rih players
FC Kryvbas-2 Kryvyi Rih players
FC Zhenis Astana players
PFC Lokomotiv Tashkent players
FC Hirnyk Kryvyi Rih players
FC AGMK players
FC Poltava players
FC Tytan Armyansk players
FC Inhulets-2 Petrove players
FC Ukraine United players
Ukrainian Premier League players
Kazakhstan Premier League players
Uzbekistan Super League players
Ukrainian First League players
Canadian Soccer League (1998–present) players
Association football defenders
Ukrainian expatriate footballers
Ukrainian expatriate sportspeople in Canada
Expatriate soccer players in Canada
Ukrainian Second League players